Sardeh Band Airport is an airport located at the town of Sardeh Band, and about  north of the Russian-built dam called Sardeh Band Dam (built in 1967) on the eastern edge of Andar District, Ghazni Province, Afghanistan.

Though the airstrip is still evident against the surrounding desert, it has not been maintained since Russian military Forces withdrew from Afghanistan and there are no structures to support it. During the U.S. invasion of Afghanistan, the airstrip was used in a limited capacity by U.S. Special Operations Forces.

Facilities

Incidents
On 12 June 2002 a Lockheed MC-130H Hercules was participating in a night exfiltration mission to remove U.S. Army Special Forces troops from the area when it tried to take off from the airstrip.  The plane impacted the ground and crashed in a barren area,  from the airstrip.

See also
List of airports in Afghanistan

References

External links
 
 Airport record for Sardeh Band Airport at Landings.com. Retrieved 2013-8-1

Airports in Afghanistan
Ghazni Province
Afghanistan–Soviet Union relations
Soviet foreign aid
Military installations of the Soviet Union in other countries